Marc B. Schenker is a professor of Public Health Sciences and Medicine at the University of California, Davis and the director of the Migration and Health Research Center (MAHRC).

See also
Migration and Health Research Center
Health Initiative of the Americas

External links 
Marc B. Schenker Information Page

References 

University of California, Davis faculty
University of California, Berkeley staff
University of California, San Francisco alumni
Harvard School of Public Health alumni
Living people
Year of birth missing (living people)